This is the current list of the vice-chancellors of the universities in Bangladesh. The chancellor is the ceremonial head, the position which is held by the incumbent President of Bangladesh, currently Abdul Hamid. The vice-chancellor is the chief academic officer and the chief executive of the university appointed by the chancellor for a four-year term.

References

External links

 
Vice-Chancellors of universities in Bangladesh
Bangladesh